Ribes diacanthum, the Siberian currant, is an Asian species of currant. It is native to northeastern Asia (Russia, Mongolia, Korea, northeastern China (Heilongjiang, Jilin, Inner Mongolia)). The species is also sparingly naturalised in the Canadian Province of Manitoba, having escaped in the 1940s from an agricultural experiment station near Brandon.

Flowers are yellow-green. Fruits are red, spherical, and reportedly good-tasting.

References

External links
line drawings from Flora of China Illustrations vol. 8, fig. 319, 1-2 

Flora of Asia
Flora of Korea
Plants described in 1776
diacanthum
Taxa named by Peter Simon Pallas
Dioecious plants